was a multi-purpose event venue located in Nishigotanda, Tokyo, Japan. It hosted artists such as Judas Priest, Iron Maiden, Jewel, Stone Temple Pilots, Cheap Trick and Cyndi Lauper. The hall opened in 1982 and closed in 2015.

References

Former music venues
1982 establishments in Japan
2015 disestablishments in Japan
Music venues in Tokyo
Music venues completed in 1982
Shinagawa